Sinus tarsi syndrome is the clinical disorder of pain and tenderness in the sinus tarsi, which is the lateral side of the foot, between the ankle and the heel. The term "sinus tarsi syndrome" can also refer to swelling of the subtalar joint.  The condition is somewhat poorly understood.

Causes 
Sinus tarsi syndrome can have a variety of causes, such as:
 An inversion (rolling out) ankle sprain
 Pronation of the foot
 Flatfoot
 Excessive physical activity
 Posterior tibial tendon dysfunction (PTTD)

Symptoms 
Sinus tarsi syndrome is characterized by pain, tenderness, and instability/aggravation of the pain when walking on uneven surfaces or during weight bearing activity. The pain will be also aggravated by inversion (turning in) and eversion (turning out). Looseness of the ankle and foot joints can also occur. There is also often the presence of ligament tears, arthrofibrosis, ganglion cysts, or degeneration of the joints. Occasionally, peroneal spasms, valgus hindfoot, and limited varus motion can also be present.

Diagnosis 
X-ray can show some impingement in the sinus tarsi area. Other diagnostic tests include: bone scans, CT scans, and MRI evaluation. Doctors may inject local anesthetic to localize the problem to the sinus tarsi. Radiopharmaceuticals can also be used to identify inflammation. Ankle arthroscopy may also be used to locate damaged tissue. Diagnosis is often a process of elimination as sinus tarsi syndrome is rarely a definitive disorder.

Treatment

Conservative treatments 
Conservative (non-surgical) treatments are often considered first. Possible treatments include:

 Period of immobilization (rest)
 Activity moderation
 Supportive footwear
 Ankle sleeves/braces
 Orthotic therapy
 Anti-inflammatory medication
 Physical therapy

Resistant cases may require more invasive treatments such as:

 Corticosteroid injections into the tarsal canal
 Oral steroids
 Custom orthoses
 Cryotherapy

Surgical treatments 
Surgical treatments are very rare and reserved for highly resistant cases. Surgery can be open (via an incision) or closed (via arthroscopy).  In cases of flatfoot, sinus tarsi syndrome is complicated by the collapse of the arches. In these cases, surgery includes debridement (cleaning out) of the sinus tarsi and possible reconstruction of the foot. Surgery can also include debridement of bone spurs as well.

Prognosis 
If treated, sinus tarsi syndrome has an excellent prognosis. Full recovery is to be expected, though some patients will need rehabilitation. However, relapse can occasionally occur, especially if only conservative treatments are undergone. Sinus tarsi syndrome can be misdiagnosed as a chronic ankle sprain. Untreated sinus tarsi syndrome can develop into chronic ankle pain and disability.

History 
Sinus tarsi syndrome was first studied by Dr. Denis O'Connor in 1957. O'Connor claimed conservative treatment was ineffective and surgery was the only effective option, describing a surgery in which the surgeon resects the superficial ligamentous floor and cleans out the fat pad. O'Connor claimed all 14 patients this surgery was performed on reported relief of their symptoms. While there is not a lot of consensus in the medical community (and the disorder continues to be understudied), other treatment options, including conservative treatments, have been to proven to be viable in the time since.

See also
 Tarsal tunnel syndrome

References 

Syndromes affecting muscles
Foot diseases